John Charles Dodson, 3rd Baron Monk Bretton DL (17 July 1924 – 26 May 2022) was a British agriculturist, Sussex landowner, and hereditary peer who was a long–serving member of the House of Lords from 1948 to 1999.

John Dodson succeeded his father, John William Dodson, on 29 July 1933; aged only nine. Thus he held a peerage for 88 years (1933-2022), this is thought to be the world record. He was educated at Institut Le Rosey; Westminster (March 1941-July 1942); and New College, Oxford (matric. Michaelmas 1942; B.A. and M.A. 1952). He became a member of Brooks's in 1949 and married Zoe Diana Ian Douglas Scott, daughter of Ian Douglas Scott, of Winchelsea, Sussex, in 1958. They had two sons.

Between 1966-68 Lord and Lady Monk Bretton had Raymond Erith re-model a Queen Anne house his great-grandfather, Sir John Dodson, had acquired near Barcombe from the family of Percy Bysshe Shelley. The Dodsons had hitherto largely just rented it out; Bosie, Lord Alfred Douglas, for example, was a tenant circa 1920. The house, Shelley's Folly, Erith described as 'a little pavilion, on a knoll, built for the view'. Monk Bretton, having consequently sold another larger and newer nearby house, lived there until moving to Switzerland in 2004.

He has been a Deputy Lieutenant for East Sussex since 1983, and a stalwart of the South of England Agricultural Society show, at Ardingly, since its foundation in 1967.

Following expulsion from the House of Lords in 1999 following the passing of the House of Lords Act, he moved to the Lake Geneva northern shore.

Lord Monk Bretton died on 26 May 2022, at the age of 97.

Monk Bretton in the Lords
Lord Monk Bretton first sat in Parliament at the age of 23 on 27 January 1948. He was greeted by the Second Reading of the Parliament Act 1949. Over 51 years later the by then 75-year-old peer was excluded by the House of Lords Act 1999.
His maiden speech was made on 18 March 1948 in Lord Dowding's Notice debate on the Slaughter of Animals.

At 5.30 p.m. on Tuesday 9 November 1999 Lord Grantchester rose to ask Her Majesty's Government how their proposals for the milk industry and in particular for the supply of raw milk will affect the rural economy, in the ensuing debate Monk Bretton made his valediction.
He concluded his 13-minute speech thus:
That is the end of my remarks, but I wish also to say goodbye. It is likely that the noble Lord, Lord Grantchester, who initiated this debate, and I will no longer attend this House. I am delighted that a maiden speaker (Lord Carlile of Berriew) is to speak after me. I hope that he will carry the torch for British dairying.

Some ancestors

References

Lucy Archer, Raymond Erith, Architect, The Cygnet Press, 1985, (pages 184 & 185).

External links
John Charles Dodson, 3rd Baron Monk Bretton at ThePeerage.com
 Lords' speech on 21 May 1999 in the second reading debate of Lord Renton of Mount Harry's Area of Outstanding Natural Beauty Bill.
Quoted in The Guardian, 5 November 1999. The paper edition had a photograph of him on the front page.
Valedictory Milk debate in Hansard, House of Lords, 9 November 1999.
New Residence (French Wiki)

1924 births
2022 deaths
People educated at Westminster School, London
Alumni of New College, Oxford
Barons in the Peerage of the United Kingdom
Monk Bretton
Monk Bretton
Conservative Party (UK) hereditary peers
Deputy Lieutenants of East Sussex
Eldest sons of British hereditary barons
Alumni of Institut Le Rosey
Monk Bretton